Alyas Batman en Robin is a 1991 Filipino musical-comedy film which spoofs the titular superheroes from DC Comics, Batman and Robin. It stars Joey de Leon as Batman, Rene Requiestas as the Joker, Dawn Zulueta as Angelique Legarda, Vina Morales as Vina, de Leon's son Keempee as Robin, and Panchito as the Penguin. Several songs in the film use melodies taken from other pop songs such as "At the Hop", Bird Dog and "Surfin' Safari".

Originally produced by Viva Films, the film was delayed from its original release in early 1989 when King Features objected to the use of their characters' names and costumes. The film was eventually produced and released on April 6, 1991, albeit by Viva Film's rival studio, Regal Films.

Plot

Cast

Joey de Leon as Batman
Rene Requiestas as the Joker/Jocson
Dawn Zulueta as Angelique Legarda
Vina Morales as Vina
Keempee de Leon as Robin/Kevin
Panchito as Tiyo Paenguin/Tiyo Paeng
Almira Muhlach as Catwoman
Chinkee Tan as Glasses
Cathy Mora
Ruben Rustia
Mon Alvir
Bomber Moran
Joaquin Fajardo
Yoyong Martirez
Rommel Valdez
Ernie Forte
Rene Hawkins
Danny Rojo
Bert Cayanan
Rey Solo
Jun de Guia
Ariel Villasanta
Nemy Gutierez
Enciong Reyes

Production
The film was initially an unauthorized production from Viva Films, set to be released in 1989 to capitalize on the then in-production 1989 Batman film starring Michael Keaton. Shooting lasted into June 1989, with comedians Joey de Leon and Rene Requiestas alleging that Dawn Zulueta was causing delays in the final weeks of shooting due to prioritizing her other commitments. However, King Features objected to the use of their characters' names and costumes, which resulted in production being halted a day before its completion. Despite de Leon's attempt to remedy the situation by proposing to title the film Hello Batman... How's Robin, the release of the film was still blocked for some time. The film was eventually produced and released by Regal Films in 1991, two years later than the intended 1989 release.

A sequel was planned, launching Thursday group member and popular matinee teen idol and heartthrob Hector Chua. However, those plans did not materialize.

Spoofs
The "R" on the Robin costume was intentionally stylized to resemble the logo of its eventual producer, Regal Films, a rival to the film's original production company Viva Films.

Panchito's Tiyo Paenguin literally means "Uncle Paenguin", which is a portmanteau of the names "Tiyo Paeng" and "Penguin". The name is also a double entendre of the Spanish term for fellatio.

Joey de Leon imitates the mannerisms of Fernando Poe Jr. in some scenes of the film. Ironically, Poe had earlier produced a similar spoof film of Batman in 1965.

Dawn Zulueta's character is based on Vicky Vale, Batman's love-interest who works as a reporter in the comics and as a photojournalist in Kim Basinger's version of the character in the 1989 film . Similarly, her name is a combination of the names of then-ABS-CBN News and Current Affairs correspondents, Angelique Lazo and Loren Legarda. Her butler, Noli Boy, on the other hand is a spoof of another ABS-CBN anchor Noli de Castro, with him often quoting the latter's signature Magandang Gabi, Bayan.

See also
Alyas Batman at Robin, a 1965 Filipino film
James Batman

References

External links
Alyas Batman en Robin Movie Gallery

1991 films
1990s musical comedy films
1990s superhero comedy films
Unofficial Batman films
Philippine superhero films
Regal Entertainment films
Robin (character) films
Philippine musical comedy films
1990s Tagalog-language films
Films directed by Tony Y. Reyes
1990s American films